La Proiselière-et-Langle is a commune in the Haute-Saône department in the region of Bourgogne-Franche-Comté in eastern France.

See also 
Communes of the Haute-Saône department

References 

Communes of Haute-Saône